Jamia-tul-Madina is a chain of Islamic universities in India, Pakistan and in European and other countries established by Dawat-e-Islami. The Jamia-tul-Madina is also known as Faizan-e-Madina. Dawat-e-Islami has grown its network of Madaris from Pakistan to Europe.

Branches
Jamia-tul-Madina has 200+ branches in Pakistan, 11 in India and 18 in other countries.

Programmes
Weekly religious congregations are held regularly on weekends in every campus of Jamia-tul-Madina.

In Pakistan
The number of students are 11719 in Jamia-tul-Madina, Karachi, Pakistan .

In India

In other countries
Faizan-e-Madina institutes of Islamic education are spread in various countries around the world.
Faizan-e-Madina, United Kingdom Peterborough
Faizan-e-Madina, Hong Kong in Tsuen Wan

References

External links

Official Website 

Dawat-e-Islami
Islamic schools in Pakistan
Madrasas in Pakistan
Madrasas in India
Islam in the United Kingdom
Madrasas in Bangladesh
Educational institutions established in 1995
1995 establishments in Pakistan
Barelvi Islamic universities and colleges